This article lists Wikipedia articles about Members of Parliament, in the House of Commons of Canada elected as Labour (or Independent Labour) MPs. Labour and Independent Labour MPs founded the Ginger Group in 1924 with individual, left-wing United Farmers and Progressive and/or Independent MPs, Of Labour MPs in the 1920s and 1930s only Malcolm Lang and Humphrey Mitchell were not in the Ginger Group.

See also List of Progressive/United Farmer MPs, List of articles about CCF/NDP members

By first election:

8th Parliament

1900 (by-election)
Arthur Puttee - Labour/Independent Labour - Winnipeg, Manitoba, 1900 (by-election)-1900 (gen. election), def. 1904

9th Parliament

1900 general election
Ralph Smith - Labour/Liberal - Vancouver, BC, 1900-1904-1908, def. 1911 (elected as Labour in 1900 but takes seat as a Liberal)

1906 (by-election)
Alphonse Verville - Labour - Maisonneuve, Quebec, 1906-1908-1911-1911-1917 (re-elected as "Laurier Liberal" in 1917)

13th Parliament

1919 by-election
John Wilfred Kennedy - United Farmers of Ontario-Labour - Glengarry & Stormont, Ontario, 1919-1921 (re-elected as Progressive in 1921)

14th Parliament

1921 general election

0+3
 
James Shaver Woodsworth - Labour - Winnipeg Centre, Manitoba - 1921-1925-1926-1930-1935-1940 (Ginger Group member, leader of CCF from 1932)
William Irvine - Labour - East Calgary, Alberta - 1921, def. 1925, later elected as UFA and CCF (Ginger Group member)
Joseph Tweed Shaw - Independent, but supported by Labour and the United Farmers of Alberta - Calgary West, Alberta - 1921, def. 1925 (Ginger Group Member) (ran for Liberals in 1935 and defeated)

16th Parliament

1926 general election
J.S. Woodsworth (re-elected)
 and one more.

16th Parliament

1926 general election
2+2
J.S. Woodsworth (re-elected)
Herbert Bealey Adshead - Labour - Calgary East, Alberta, 1926, def. 1930 (Ginger Group Member)
Malcolm Lang - Labour - Timiskaming South, Ontario, 1926, def.1930 (as Liberal-Labour)

17th Parliament

1930 general election
2+1
Angus MacInnis - Independent Labour - Vancouver South, British Columbia, 1930-1935-1940-1945-1949-1953 (Ginger Group Member, founding member of CCF, elected as CCF beg 1935, did not run 1957)

1931 by-election
Humphrey Mitchell - Labour - Hamilton 1931 (def. 1935, later elected as a Liberal)

18th Parliament

1935 general election
1
Agnes Macphail - United Farmers of Ontario-Labour - Grey-Bruce, Ontario, 1935 (sits with CCF, elected in four prior elections as UFO or Progressive and founding member of Ginger Group, def. 1940)

References

Labour